Fra Pietro Erardi (1644–1727) was a Maltese chaplain and painter. He was a cleric and became a chaplain of obedience of the Order of St. John in 1669. He joined the Wignacourt College in Rabat in 1683 and remained there until his death.

Erardi came from a family of painters, being the brother of Stefano Erardi and the uncle of Alessio Erardi, and he owned a significant collection of artworks. He was himself a minor artist, and he painted a large work depicting St. Paul's Shipwreck for the parish church dedicated to that saint in Rabat. He donated some of his works to the Wignacourt College.

References

1644 births
1727 deaths
17th-century Maltese painters
18th-century Maltese painters
18th-century male artists
Maltese clergy
Catholic chaplains
Maltese artists